The Baeksang Arts Awards for Best New Director (TV) was annually presented at the Baeksang Arts Awards ceremony.

List of winners

Sources

External links
  

Awards established in 1988
Awards disestablished in 2011
Baeksang Arts Awards (television)